Georg Parma (born 15 April 1997) is an Austrian sport climber. He competes in lead climbing, bouldering and speed climbing competitions. Currently he lives in Graz where he prepares for the 2020 Summer Olympics.

Biography
Georg Parma started climbing at the age of 5.

In 2012 he won the European Youth Championships in Singapore (lead climbing, Youth B) and placed third in the World Youth Championships held in Gémozac. 2014 he repeated those results (lead climbing, this time Youth A) at the European Youth Championships in Edinburgh and at the World youth Championships in Nouméa, in lead Youth A. In 2014 and 2015 he won the European Youth Cup in lead climbing.

Since 2014 (at age of 17) he participates in Climbing World Cup competitions.

He won the Austrian National Championships in lead climbing 2015 and in bouldering in 2018.

Ranking

World Youth Championships

European Youth Championships

European Youth Cup

References

External links

 Personal Website 
 Instagram
 IFSC profile

Austrian rock climbers
Living people
1997 births
20th-century Austrian people
21st-century Austrian people